Jesper Bratt (born 30 July 1998) is a Swedish professional ice hockey winger for the New Jersey Devils of the National Hockey League (NHL).

Playing career
Bratt was drafted by the New Jersey Devils in the sixth round (162nd overall) in the 2016 NHL Entry Draft after playing 48 games with AIK in HockeyAllsvenskan, scoring 17 points. He signed a three-year, entry-level contract with the Devils on 13 May 2017.

Bratt made the Devils opening night roster for the 2017–18 season after a strong showing in training camp, and scored two points in his first NHL game, a power play goal and a shorthanded assist in a 4–1 victory over the Colorado Avalanche.

After fracturing his jaw in early October 2018 during practice, Bratt made his 2018–19 season debut on 9 November against the Toronto Maple Leafs.

On 10 January 2021, Bratt was re-signed to a two-year, $5.5 million contract by the Devils. On 19 March 2023, Bratt recorded his first NHL hat trick in a 5–2 win over the Tampa Bay Lightning.

International play

Bratt played for the Swedish national team in the 2019 IIHF World Championship held in Slovakia.

Career statistics

Regular season and playoffs

International

References

External links
 

1998 births
AIK IF players
Living people
New Jersey Devils draft picks
New Jersey Devils players
Ice hockey people from Stockholm
Swedish ice hockey left wingers